Geotrygon is a bird genus in the pigeon and dove family (Columbidae). Its members are called quail-doves, and all live in the Neotropics. The species of this genus have ranges from southern Mexico and Central America to the West Indies and South America. Quail-doves are ground-dwelling birds that live, nest, and feed in dense forests. They are remarkable for their purple to brown coloration with light-and-dark facial markings.

The genus Geotrygon was introduced in 1847 by English naturalist Philip Henry Gosse. The name combines the Ancient Greek geō- meaning "ground-" and trygōn meaning "turtledove". The type species was subsequently designated as the crested quail-dove (Geotrygon versicolor).

The genus contains nine species:
 Grey-fronted quail-dove, G. caniceps
 Key West quail-dove, G. chrysia
 †Puerto Rican quail-dove, Geotrygon larva - prehistoric

 White-fronted quail-dove or Hispaniolan quail-dove, G. leucometopius
 Ruddy quail-dove, G. montana
 Bridled quail-dove, G. mystacea
 Purple quail-dove,  G. purpurata
 Sapphire quail-dove, G. saphirina
 Crested quail-dove, G. versicolor
 Violaceous quail-dove, G. violacea

Members of the genera Zentrygon and Leptotrygon are also known as quail-doves, and were formerly included in Geotrygon. The species Starnoenas cyanocephala was previously referred to as a quail-dove, though this English name is no longer used.

References

 

 
Higher-level bird taxa restricted to the Neotropics
Taxa named by Philip Henry Gosse
Taxonomy articles created by Polbot